Precious Okoye  (born 17 February 1995) is a Nigerian model and entrepreneur, she is an ex-beauty pageant titleholder and the winner of the Miss Polo Nigeria 2019 pageantry.

Career
She started modelling in 2013 in Lagos. In 2017, she won the face of Black Opal Nigeria.

Miss Polo Nigeria
She was crowned the winner and queen of the 2019 edition of the Miss Polo Nigeria held in Lagos, Nigeria on the 24th July, 2019. The pageantry drew 35 contestants each representing each state in Nigeria.

Miss Polo International
Precious represented Nigeria at the Miss Polo International 2019 edition, held on 14 September 2019 at Jumeirah Zabeel Saray, Dubai, where she won the Miss Polo Africa title and placed top 5. 23 delegates and models from other countries contested in the pageantry.

References

Living people
1995 births
Nigerian beauty pageant winners
 Igbo people